Tonight is Kim Hyun-joong's third Japanese single. There are five available versions of this single which has five completely different image concepts for each of the single covers. Each version includes different limited editions that may include a DVD with the music video to the three new songs.

Reception
On the first day of its release, Tonight single came up to second place right away with 101,818 copies sold, and taking the number two spot by the end of the week. The album received Gold certificate for selling more than 100,000 copies and has recently been certified platinum with 250,000 copies sold worldwide.

Jackets A-D (Limited Editions) and E (Normal Edition)

Music videos
 "Tonight"
 "Cappuccino"
 "君だけを消せなくて"

Release history

Charts

References

External links
 
 
 

SS501 songs
2013 singles
Japanese-language songs
Universal Music Japan singles
2013 songs
Songs written by Sean Alexander